Mulligan is a surname originating from Ireland, coming from the Irish Ó Maolagáin literally meaning "grandson of the bald man".

 Andy Mulligan (author), English writer
 Blackjack Mulligan, stage name of American professional wrestler and American football player Robert Windham
 Brennan Lee Mulligan (born 1988), American comedian, writer, performer, and gamemaster
 Buck Mulligan, given name Malachi Mulligan, fictional character in James Joyce's novel Ulysses
 Carey Mulligan, British actress
 Charles Mulligan, American sculptor
 Cynthia Mulligan, Canadian television personality
 David Mulligan, New Zealand association football (soccer) player
 Declan Mulligan (1938-2021), Irish-born American rock musician
 Eddie Mulligan, American baseball player
 Gary Mulligan, Irish association football (soccer) player
 Geoff Mulligan, American Computer Scientist, IoT developer
 Gerry Mulligan, American musician
 Hercules Mulligan, a spy for the patriot forces in the American Revolutionary War
 Colonel James A. Mulligan, American Civil War soldier
 James Hillary Mulligan, American judge, politician, and poet
 James Venture Mulligan, Australian bushman and prospector
 John Mulligan, new wave musician with Fashion (1978–84)
 John Mulligan (baseball), played for the Washington Nationals in 1884
 Kevin Mulligan, British philosopher
 Leith Mulligan, Australian sports journalist
 Marty Mulligan, Australian tennis player
 Mary Mulligan, Scottish politician
 Colonel Michael Mulligan, American military prosecutor
 Noel Mulligan, Australian rugby league footballer
 Richard Mulligan (19322000), American actor
 Richard Mulligan (footballer), New Zealand association football (soccer) player
 Robert Mulligan, American film director
 Rosemary Mulligan, American politician
 Terry David Mulligan, Canadian actor
 William Hughes Mulligan, American judge

See also
 Mulligan (disambiguation)
 "Nancy Mulligan", song by Ed Sheeran
 Ted Mullighan  (1939–2011), an Australian judge

Surnames of Irish origin